Saat Phere: Saloni Ka Safar (International title: Saloni) is a Hindi television serial that was broadcast on Zee TV from 17 October 2005 to 28 May 2009. The story focuses on Saloni, who faces social discrimination because of her dark skin. The series starred Rajshree Thakur and Sharad Kelkar.

Plot 
The story revolves around the life of Saloni, who despite being dark-skinned, sets out to prove that it doesn't matter what skin colour you might be. She marries Nahar and begins her journey fulfilling the seven rounds she took at her marriage. Saloni faces many problems, particularly, discrimination for her skin colour. 

However she is talented and sets out on a journey, to create an identity for herself. She faces many enemies such as Kaveri, Karan, Kuki Kaki, Padam, Chandni / Devika, Urvashi, Abhi, Varun and more. The series is titled Saat Phere in the context of seven rounds a couple takes at their wedding. This is Saloni's journey and after generation leap, her daughter Savri also faces many obstacles, in the end Saloni is reunited with her family and her daughters get married.

Cast 

 Rajshree Thakur as Saloni Singh / Saloni Nahar Singh - Narpat and Ambika's daughter, Nahar's wife, Savri's mother, Shweta's adoptive mother, Shubhra and Samar's elder sister (2005-2009)
 Sharad Kelkar as Nahar Singh - Saloni's husband, Savri's father, Shweta's adoptive father, Brijesh and Aditi's younger brother, Piya's elder brother (2005-2008) / Swami Amritanand (2008-2009)
 Raqesh Bapat as Neel / Neerav - Saloni's childhood friend and ex-boyfriend, Shubhra's ex-husband, Dr. Nishi's husband (2005-2008)
 Mohan Bhandari as Narpat Singh, Saloni, Shubhra and Samar's father (2005-2009)
 Pratichi Mishra as Ambika Narpat Singh, Saloni, Shubhra and Samar's mother (2005-2009)
 Neena Gupta as Manorama (Manno) Bhabhi, Saloni, Shubhra and Samar's aunt, Narendra's wife, Abhi's mother (2005-2009)
 Surekha Sikri as Bhabho, Saloni and Tara's adoptive mother-in-law,  Brijesh, Aditi, Nahar and Piya's adoptive mother (2005-2009)
 Bharat Kaul as Abhay Singh, Brijesh, Aditi, Nahar and Piya's father (2007)
 Ahmed Khan as Mr. Singh, Abhay's father, Brijesh, Aditi, Nahar and Piya's grandfather (2007)
 Akshay Anand as Brijesh Singh, Saloni's brother-in-law, Tara and Urvashi's husband, Aditya's father (2005-2009)
 Ashlesha Sawant as Tara Singh / Tara Brijesh Singh, Saloni's sister-in-law, Brijesh's wife, Urvashi's stepsister, Aditya's adoptive mother (2005-2009)
 Aditi Pratap as Aditi Singh - Brijesh's younger sister, Nahar and Piya's elder sister, Dheer's wife, Ishaan's mother (2005-2007)
 Ashish Kapoor as Dheer - Aditi's husband, Ishaan's father (2005-2009)
 Gaurav Vaish as Ishaan, Dheer and Aditi's son (2005-2009)
 Amrita Prakash as Piya Singh, Brijesh, Aditi and Nahar's younger sister, Shridhar's ex-wife, the false Abhi / Shekhar's wife (2005-2006)
 Keerti Gaekwad Kelkar as Chandni Singh, Padam Singh's daughter / Devika Nahar Singh, Nahar's ex-wife (double role) (2006-2007) Antagonist
 Sachin Sharma as Dev, Chandni's husband (2007)
 Poonam Gulati as Shubhra Singh / Shubhra Kunjan Singh - Saloni's younger sister, Samar's younger sister, Karan's girlfriend, Neel's ex-wife, Kunjan's wife (2005-2008)
 Chetanya Adib as Kunjan Singh - Shubhra's husband (2005-2008)
 Meenakshi Verma as Padma Gajpratap Singh - Shubhra's mother-in-law, Kunjan's mother (2005-2008)
 Tej Sapru as Gajpratap Singh - Shubhra's father-in-law, Kunjan's father (2007-2008)
 Mazher Sayed as Samar Singh- Saloni and Shubhra's younger brother, Kaveri's husband, Kamini's father, Nikita's adoptive father (2005-2009)
 Aanchal Dwiwedi as Kaveri Chaudhary / Kaveri Samar Singh - Saloni's sister-in-law, Samar's wife, Kamini's mother, Nikita's adoptive mother (2005-2009) 
 Apara Mehta as Kuki Veer Singh - Brijesh, Aditi, Nahar and Piya's aunt, Veer's ex-wife, Kshitij's mother (2006-2008) Antagonist
 Sadiya Siddiqui as Gayatri Singh - Saloni's paternal aunt, Dhananjay's wife (2005-2007)
 Sachin Khurana as Dhananjay - Gayatri's husband (2005-2007)
 Nattasha Singh as Juhi (2006)
 Shaleen Bhanot as Karan - Shubhra's boyfriend (2005-2006) Antagonist
 Nivedita Bhattacharya as Urvashi Singh / Urvashi Brijesh Singh - Tara's stepsister, Brijesh's ex-wife, Veer's wife, Aditya's mother (2006-2009) Antagonist
 Farida Dadi as Maa Sa, Tara's stepmother, Urvashi's mother (2006-2008)
 Akshay Sethi as Yug (2006-2007)
 Aastha Chaudhary as Urmila Singh, Padam Singh's out-of-wedlock daughter (2007)
 Jasveer Kaur as Katari (2006)
 Narendra Gupta as Aapji - Neel's grandfather (2005-2006)
 Vineet Kumar - Kaveri's father
 Sharmilee Raj as Chamki (2007)
 Barkha Madan as Reva Sehgal - Brijesh, Aditi, Nahar and Piya's stepsister (2006-2007)
 Shahbaz Khan as Padam Singh - Chandni, Devika and Urmila's father (2007) Antagonist
 Amit Dolawat as Shridhar - Piya's first husband (2007)
 Sachin Shroff as Fake Abhi / Shekhar Sharma - Manno Bhabhi and Narendra's fake son and Piya's second husband (2007) Antagonist
 Anand Suryavanshi as Samar Singh- Saloni and Shubhra's younger brother, Kaveri's husband, Kamini's father, Nikita's adoptive father (2005)
 Shweta Kawatra as Reva Sehgal - Brijesh, Aditi, Nahar and Piya's stepsister (2005)
 Sonika Sahay as Ginni - Nikita's mother (2007-2008)
 Gunjan Walia as Vrinda - Dheer's second wife and Ishaan's stepmother (2007-2008)
 Niyati Joshi as Piya Singh, Brijesh, Aditi and Nahar's younger sister, Shridhar's ex-wife, fake Abhi / Shekhar's wife (2006-2009)
 Poonam Joshi as Dr. Nishi - Neel's second wife, Brigadier and Shanti's former daughter-in-law (2007-2008)
 Mahru Sheikh as Shanti, Brigadier's wife, Dr. Nishi's mother-in-law (2007-2008)
 Rajeev Verma as Brigadier, Shanti's husband, Dr. Nishi's father-in-law (2007-2008)
 Pracheen Chauhan as Kshitij Singh - Nahar and Brijesh's cousin, Veer and Kuki's son, Kalika's husband (2008)
 Amita Nangia as Shyama Singh - Narpat's girlfriend and Kalika's mother (2008)
 Aashka Goradia as Advocate Kalika Singh / Advocate Kalika Kshitij Singh - Saloni's stepsister, Narpat and Shyama's daughter, Kshitij's Wife, Veer and Kuki's daughter-in-law (2008)
 Pratima Kazmi as Lali Maasi (2008)
 Zahida Parveen as Savitri - Savri's adoptive mother (2008-2009)
 Mihir Mishra as Dr. Varun - Nahar's friend (2008) = Antagonist 
 Aham Sharma as Aditya Singh - Brijesh and Urvashi's son, Tara's adopted son (2009)
 Shalini Kapoor as Madhu (2009)
 Ali Merchant as Rajveer - Shweta's husband, Saloni's adoptive son-in-law (2009)
 Vishal Watwani as Rohit - Neel's friend (2005-2006)
 Amit Sarin as Advocate Pratap Chauhan (2006)
 Amit Jain as Daksh - Savri's husband, Saloni's son-in-law (2009)
 Parikshit Sahni as Veer Singh - Brijesh, Aditi, Nahar and Piya's uncle, Kuki's ex-husband, Kshitij's father, Urvashi's husband, Kalika's father-in-law (2007-2008)
 Sonal Pendse as Neelima - Nahar's ex-girlfriend (2006)
 Yusuf Hussain as Shamsher Singh - Tara and Urvashi's father (2006)
 Prithvi Zutshi as Narendra Singh - Saloni's uncle, Manno's husband, Abhi's father, Narpat's elder brother (2006-2007)
 Sonia Singh as Tanya - Samar's secretary (2007)
 Vijay Badlani as Sushant - Shekhar's friend (2007)
 Iira Soni as Kamini Singh - Samar and Kaveri's daughter (2009)
 Puneet Sachdev as Aman - Shweta's fiancé (2009)
 Sujata Krishnamurthy as Guruma - Swami Amritanand's mother (2008-2009)
 Rachana Parulkar as Savri Singh, Saloni and Nahar's daughter (2009)
 Ulka Gupta as Child Savri Singh (2009)
 Amrapali Dubey as Shweta Singh, Saloni and Nahar's adopted daughter (2009)
 Hiba Nawab as Child Shweta Singh (2009)

Production
In November 2008, the shootings and telecast of all the Hindi television series including this series and films were stalled on 8 November 2008 due to dispute by the technician workers of FWICE (Federation of Western India Cine Employees) for increasing the wages, better work conditions and more breaks between shootings. FWICE first took a strike on 1 October 2008 when they addressed their problems with the producers and production was stalled. A contract was signed after four days discussions and shooting were happening only for two hours content in a day then after which differences increased between them while channels gave them time until 30 October 2008 to sort it out. Failing to do so lead to protests again from 10 November 2008 to 19 November 2008 during which channels blacked out new broadcasts and repeat telecasts were shown from 10 November 2008. On 19 November 2008, the strike was called off after settling the disputes and the production resumed. The new episodes started to telecast from 1 December 2008.

Lead Sharad Kelkar was supposed to shoot for only 30 episodes for the series. But, good response for the series made him to continue until he quit before the generation leap. However, he returned to the series for the finale episode.

In October 2008, lead Rajshree Thakur confirmed quitting the show to spend time with her family and quit along with Kelkar when the series took a generation leap in April end of 2009. In April 2009, the series took a generation leap with addition of new casts, with story focussing on lead character Saloni's children when Rachana Parulkar was cast as Saawri.

The series which was one of the top rated show for a long time with more than 6+ TVR. Later, when the ratings dipped, a generation leap was taken which was also unsuccessful in increasing the ratings as before which made channel to end the series in the same month after it. Speaking about ending the series, Producer Sunjoy Wadhwa said, "Saat Phere was Saloni’s story. The leap meant regenerating a story from scratch, which isn’t working for us. So, it’s best to end it now" and stated its ended on 22 May 2009. However, it ended on 28 May 2009.

Reception

Critics

India Today described the plot of the series as simple.

Ratings
Initially, it ranged between 1.8-2 TVR. Within a month it started averaging 2-3 TVR and then gradually increased until ranging 6+TVR during 2006 becoming one of the most watched Hindi GEC. In April and May, it averaged 4.44 TVR overall.  In December 2006, it garnered 5.1 TVR. In week ending 17 March 2007, it garnered 1.59 TVR. As in July 2007, it averaged 3.4 TVR.

The highest rating garnered in its runtime was 6.61 TVR during May 2006.

References

External links

2005 Indian television series debuts
2009 Indian television series endings
Zee TV original programming
Indian television soap operas
Television shows set in Rajasthan